Acrow Halt was a railway station on the Saffron Walden Railway. Located at the north-eastern edge of Saffron Walden, Essex, the station was close to the Coronation Works of Acrow Engineering Ltd., which it served between 1957 and 1964.

History
Acrow railway station was named after the nearby Acrow Works. The name Acrow derived from the name of Arthur Crow, the solicitor of William Aphonse de Vigier who was the owner of the factory and the inventor of the Acrow prop.
Opened by the Eastern Region of British Railways on 25 March 1957, it was then closed by the British Railways Board on 7 September 1964, after a short existence of seven years.

Notes

Sources

External links
 Position of Acrow Halt on navigable 1946 O.S. map
  (Images of the former Acrow railway station site as of 2013)
 

Disused railway stations in Essex
Railway stations opened by British Rail
Railway stations in Great Britain opened in 1957
Railway stations in Great Britain closed in 1964
Beeching closures in England